María del Rosario Merlín García (born 1 November 1964) is a Mexican politician affiliated with the PRD. She currently serves as Deputy of the LXII Legislature of the Mexican Congress representing Guerrero.

References

1964 births
Living people
Politicians from Guerrero
People from Acapulco
Women members of the Chamber of Deputies (Mexico)
Party of the Democratic Revolution politicians
21st-century Mexican politicians
21st-century Mexican women politicians
Members of the Congress of Guerrero
Deputies of the LXII Legislature of Mexico
Members of the Chamber of Deputies (Mexico) for Guerrero